Wild Is the Wind is a 1957 film starring Anna Magnani and Anthony Quinn, and it may also refer to:
 
 "Wild Is the Wind" (song), the title song from the film, also covered by David Bowie
 Wild Is the Wind (album), an album by Nina Simone
 Wild Is the Wind (2022 film), a South African crime drama film
 "Wild Is the Wind", a song by Bon Jovi from New Jersey
 Wild Is the Wind, a 2018 poetry collection by Carl Phillips